Richard John Beato (born April 24, 1962) is an American YouTube personality, multi-instrumentalist, and music producer and educator. Since the early 1980s, he has worked variously as a musician, songwriter, audio engineer, and record producer, and has lectured on music at several universities. Based in Black Dog Sound Studios in Stone Mountain, a suburb of Atlanta, Georgia, he has produced for and worked with bands such as Needtobreathe, Parmalee, and Shinedown. He is now known for his YouTube channel, Everything Music, on which he covers different aspects of rock, jazz, and popular music, and he interviews well-known musicians and producers.

Early life and education
After graduating from Fairport High School in 1980, he studied at Ithaca College, obtaining a Bachelor of Arts degree in music. He earned a master's degree in jazz studies from the New England Conservatory of Music in 1987.

Career
Beato has been a session musician, university lecturer, songwriter, studio engineer, mixer, and record producer. He has lectured at several universities, including the University of Alabama and Berklee College of Music.

Studio
Beato owns Black Dog Sound Studios in Stone Mountain, Georgia, and he began recording bands there in 1995. He ran the record label 10 Star Records with business partner Johnny Diamond.

Writing credit
"Carolina", which he co-wrote with Parmalee in 2007, reached number one on Billboards Country Airplay chart on December 20, 2013, and has sold a million copies.

Signature guitar 
In 2021, Gibson previewed a Rick Beato signature Gibson Les Paul Special Double Cut. The guitar is offered in a special TV Blue Mist finish with P-90 pickups and Beato's signature on the truss rod cover. This model is one of Gibson's few signature guitar models not associated with an artist or associated with a particular act.

Other contributions
 Welcoming Home the Astronauts (2001 Sony/Epic) by Flickerstick, was produced in part by Beato- including the songs "Smile", "Got a Feeling", and "Beautiful".
 Broken People by Muddy Magnolias, was produced in part by Beato.
Herbie Fully Loaded (2005), producer: "More Than a Feeling"
Raising Helen (2004), writer: "Never Be the Same"

YouTube career
A YouTube video of his eldest child, Dylan, who has perfect pitch and is able to identify individual notes within complex chords after just one hearing, received three million views, causing Beato to decide to parlay this social-media fame into a full-fledged YouTube channel. , the YouTube channel has 3.2 million subscribers.

Beato's channel is under his own name, although he introduces every video with the title "Everything Music". One series in the channel is called What Makes This Song Great?, in which Beato deconstructs and discusses the elements of popular songs. The videos in the series regularly get over one million views.  He posts videos on music theory and production techniques, song lists (like "Top 20 Acoustic Guitar Intros"), and interviews with artists, producers, and other music industry professionals. 

Several of Beato's YouTube videos, including those about Radiohead and Fleetwood Mac, were issued take-down notices because of copyright claims. In July 2020, Beato testified about his experiences on YouTube before a United States Senate Committee on the Judiciary reviewing the Digital Millennium Copyright Act and considering limitations and exceptions such as fair use.

In February 2023, Beato released on his YouTube channel an extensive interview video with Keith Jarrett, made at Jarrett's home and home studio after Jarrett suffered two strokes; it received nearly half a million views in its first few days of publication and was praised by journalist and radio veteran Bill King.

Bibliography 
The Beato Book – A Creative Approach to Improvisation for Guitar and Other Instruments.

References

External links
Official website
 
 
Discography at AllMusic.com
Rick Beato Everything Music YouTube channel
 Songview entry at Broadcast Music, Inc.
 and 

20th-century American guitarists
20th-century American male musicians
21st-century American guitarists
21st-century American male musicians
American male guitarists
American music educators
American session musicians
Ithaca College alumni
1962 births
Living people
Music YouTubers
Musicians from Georgia (U.S. state)
Musicians from Rochester, New York
New England Conservatory alumni
Record producers from Georgia (U.S. state)
Record producers from New York (state)
Songwriters from Georgia (U.S. state)
Songwriters from New York (state)
American male songwriters
American people of Italian descent
American YouTubers